Nicola Glencross (born 21 April 1989) is a Scottish professional wrestler currently signed to WWE, where she performs on the Raw brand under the ring name Nikki Cross. She is a one-time WWE Raw Women's Champion, three-time WWE Women's Tag Team Champion and an 11-time and final WWE 24/7 Champion.

Glencross began her wrestling career on the independent circuit under the ring name Nikki Storm, most notably performing for Insane Championship Wrestling, Pro-Wrestling: EVE, and Shimmer Women Athletes. In 2016, Glencross signed a contract with WWE, changing her ring name to Nikki Cross. During her first years with the company, she worked on the NXT brand as part of the stable Sanity. Her first character gimmick was that of a psychopathic and unhinged woman who would suffer mood swings. In mid-2018, Sanity was drafted to SmackDown without Cross, who stayed in NXT.

Cross was promoted to the main roster in December 2018. In 2019, Cross was drafted to Raw and formed a tag team with Alexa Bliss, winning the WWE Women's Tag Team Championship twice. From June 2021 to October 2022, Glencross' character became a faux-inspired superhero known as Nikki A. S. H. (standing for "Almost A Superhero"); in July 2021 as A. S. H., she won the Money in the Bank contract and successfully cashed it in the next day to become Raw Women's Champion, eventually reverting to the Cross name and persona.

Early life 
Nicola Glencross was born and raised in Glasgow, Scotland and graduated from the University of Glasgow with a Bachelor of Arts and Master's degree in history. She is also a qualified fitness instructor and personal trainer.

Professional wrestling career

Early career (2008–2016) 

In September 2008, Glencross made her professional wrestling debut with the Scottish Wrestling Alliance. She initially performed under the ring name "Nikki Storm", a name given to her by then-SWA ring announcer Marty Michaels, inspired by the X Men character Storm. In February 2010, she began working on the British independent circuit, and became a mainstay for promotions such as her debuting at the Insane Championship Wrestling (ICW), and Pro-Wrestling: EVE, where she held the Pro-Wrestling: EVE Championship three times. In 2013, Storm began touring in Japan with JWP Joshi Puroresu, and made some appearances for World Wonder Ring Stardom until the middle of the summer of 2015. 

In October 2013, Storm began wrestling for American all-female promotions Shimmer Women Athletes, Shine Wrestling and Women Superstars Uncensored. She has also wrestled for Global Force Wrestling (GFW), Absolute Intense Wrestling (AIW), World Wide Wrestling League (W3L), Queens of Combat, and World Xtreme Wrestling.

Glencross competed in Total Nonstop Action Wrestling (TNA)'s British Boot Camp 2, which began airing in October 2014, in which she was unsuccessful. During the show, she had a four-way match against Kasey Owens, Kay Lee Ray and Leah Owens, which she was victorious.

WWE (2016–present)

Sanity (2016–2018) 

Glencross received a tryout with WWE in London during the autumn of 2015, and in April 2016, she was one of ten signees that had begun training at the WWE Performance Center in Orlando, Florida. She debuted for NXT on 22 April during a live event. During a Facebook live video in August, she was introduced as Nikki Cross. She made her first televised appearance and in-ring debut on 17 August episode of NXT under the name Nikki Glencross, where she competed in a six-woman tag team match along with Carmella and Liv Morgan, defeating Daria Berenato, Mandy Rose, and Alexa Bliss.
On 12 October episode of NXT, Nikki Cross returned as part of the debuting heel stable, Sanity, along with Alexander Wolfe, Eric Young, and Sawyer Fulton (who was later replaced by Killian Dain). Nikki Cross and Young accompanied Fulton and Wolfe for their winning effort against Bobby Roode and Tye Dillinger in the first round of the Dusty Rhodes Tag Team Classic. One week later, Nikki Cross scored her first televised singles victory over Danielle Kamela, however, the decision was reversed because Nikki Cross continued to attack Kamela after the match.
On 11 January 2017 episode of NXT, Nikki Cross came to the aid of NXT Women's Champion Asuka, who was being attacked by The Iconic Duo (Billie Kay and Peyton Royce), before turning on Asuka and attacking her as well. As a result, Cross, Royce, and Kay were placed in a four-way match at the TakeOver: San Antonio event on 28 January, which Cross failed to win. In May, Cross participated in a number one contender's battle royal for Asuka's NXT Women's Championship, where she, Ruby Riot, and Ember Moon were attacked by Asuka for being the last competitors left in the match and as a result, all four of them were placed into a four-way championship match at TakeOver: Chicago, which was later changed to a three-way match after Ember Moon suffered an injury. At the event, Cross failed to capture the title. In a rematch which was contested in a three-way elimination match once again against both women, Riot was the first eliminated before the match ended in a no contest as Cross and Asuka brawled backstage. This led to a last woman standing match (the first-ever in WWE history) between the two women for the NXT Women's Championship on 28 June episode of NXT, in which Cross was once again defeated.

On 19 August at TakeOver: Brooklyn III, Cross accompanied and helped Sanity to capture the NXT Tag Team Championship from The Authors of Pain. On 20 September episode of NXT, Sanity helped Drew McIntyre against The Undisputed Era, thus turning them face in the process. In October, Cross earned herself a spot for the fatal four-way match for the vacant NXT Women's Championship at TakeOver: WarGames on 18 November, which was ultimately won by Ember Moon. During the 2018 Superstar Shake-up, her fellow stable partners Eric Young, Alexander Wolfe, and Killian Dain were drafted to SmackDown, leaving Cross on NXT to work again as a singles competitor.

In 2018, Cross began a short winning streak, defeating Lacey Evans and Vanessa Borne. Throughout the summer, Cross started a feud with Shayna Baszler over the NXT Women's Championship, which led to a match between the two at TakeOver: Chicago II, in which Cross was once again unsuccessful and was defeated by technical submission. After a short hiatus, Cross returned in August and she was placed in the Aleister Black attack storyline where she was revealed to be a witness as she was on the roof of the building at the time he was attacked. In September, Cross also started a short feud with Bianca Belair which led to a match between the two that ended in a double count-out. One month later on 17 October episode of NXT, a rematch ended in a no contest after Aleister Black returned and interrupted it to ask Cross who his attacker was. Johnny Gargano was eventually revealed as the attacker and her involvement in the storyline sparked a match between Cross and Gargano's wife Candice LeRae, whom she was able to defeat in a singles match at TakeOver: WarGames. Cross wrestled her final NXT match on 9 January 2019 episode of NXT, where she lost to Bianca Belair, officially ending the feud between the two as well.

On 6 November 2018 episode of SmackDown from Manchester, England, Cross made her surprise main roster debut on SmackDown by answering an open challenge from WWE SmackDown Women's Champion Becky Lynch, who defeated her in a non-title match. On 17 December 2018 episode of Raw, Cross was advertised as one of the six NXT wrestlers about to be moved up to the main roster. On 14 January 2019 episode of Raw, Cross made her Raw debut, teaming with Bayley and Natalya in a winning effort against The Riott Squad (Liv Morgan, Ruby Riott, and Sarah Logan). At the Royal Rumble, Cross entered her first Royal Rumble match at number 8, lasting nine minutes before being eliminated by The IIconics (Billie Kay and Peyton Royce). On 4 February episode of Raw, Cross and Alicia Fox were defeated by The Boss 'n' Hug Connection (Bayley and Sasha Banks) in a match to determine the final Raw entrants in the tag team Elimination Chamber match to determine the inaugural WWE Women's Tag Team Champions at the Elimination Chamber event. On 8 April (aired 24 April) at Worlds Collide, she took part in a triple threat match for the NXT UK Women's Championship, which was won by defending champion Toni Storm.

Teaming with Alexa Bliss (2019–2020) 
After not being mentioned during the 2019 WWE Superstar Shake-up, Cross was confirmed to have been drafted to the Raw brand on 8 May taping of Main Event (aired on 11 May). She began to work with Alexa Bliss and, during the following weeks, they would have matches for the WWE Women's Tag Team Championship and the SmackDown Women's Championship. On 5 August 2019 episode of Raw, Bliss and Cross captured the WWE Women's Tag Team Championship, marking Nikki Cross's first championship in WWE.

They would defend the title at SummerSlam and at Clash of Champions but lost it at Hell in a Cell to Asuka and Kairi Sane. Although drafted separately instead of as a team during the 2019 WWE Draft, they remained on Raw, but the team was then traded to SmackDown.

At WrestleMania 36, Cross and Bliss won the WWE Women's Tag Team Championship for a second time by defeating Asuka and Kairi Sane, but they lost it on 5 June 2020 episode of SmackDown to Bayley and Sasha Banks.

"Almost a Super Hero" (2021–2022) 
On 21 June 2021 episode of Raw, Nikki Cross debuted an inspired faux-superhero gimmick with her ring name changing to Nikki A. S. H., with A. S. H. standing for "Almost a Super Hero". At Money in the Bank, She won the women's Money in the Bank ladder match and cashed in her Money in the Bank contract the following night on Raw, defeating Charlotte Flair to win the Raw Women's Championship for the first time in her career. However, she lost the title back to Flair at SummerSlam. On 20 September episode of Raw, she would win the WWE Women's Tag Team Championship for a third time with Rhea Ripley by defeating Natalya and Tamina. They lost it on 22 November episode of Raw to Queen Zelina and Carmella, ending their reign at 63 days. On 10 January 2022 episode of Raw, she turned heel by attacking Ripley. She participated in the Royal Rumble match at the namesake event and entered at #22, eliminating fellow superheroine Mighty Molly due to being jealous of her, before she was eliminated by eventual winner Ronda Rousey. At Elimination Chamber, she entered the Elimination Chamber match for a Raw Women's Championship match at WrestleMania 38, but was eliminated by Ripley. On the 2 May episode of Raw, she would win the WWE 24/7 Championship from Dana Brooke, only to lose it to Brooke on the same episode.

In May 2022, she began to work with Doudrop as a tag team. After the Women's Tag Team Championship was vacated in May, A. S. H. and Doudrop entered a tournament to crown new champions which began in August. They lost in the first round to Alexa Bliss and Asuka. On the 30 August episode of NXT 2.0, A. S. H. and Doudrop made a surprise appearance as they challenged the NXT Women's Tag Team Champions Katana Chance and Kayden Carter for their titles at Worlds Collide, but lost the match. By doing so, A. S. H. became the first woman in WWE to challenge for all currently active women's championships in WWE.

Return of Nikki Cross (2022–present) 
On the 24 October 2022 episode of Raw, Cross interfered in a match between Bayley and Bianca Belair, attacking both women, and reverting to her "unhinged" gimmick and her "Nikki Cross" name. On the 7 November  episode of Raw, Nikki joined Damage CTRL (Bayley, Dakota Kai, and IYO SKY) in a brawl against Bianca Belair, Asuka, and Alexa Bliss. It was announced later that Nikki would team with Damage CTRL to take on Belair, Asuka, and Bliss in a WarGames match at Survivor Series WarGames on 26 November 2022. Later in the night, Nikki defeated Dana Brooke to win her 11th 24/7 Championship, but later discarded the title belt backstage; the title was deactivated shortly thereafter. She then started a storyline where she stalked Candice LeRae.

Personal life 
In 2019, Glencross married her long-time boyfriend and former Sanity stablemate, Damian Mackle, better known as Killian Dain.

Championships and accomplishments 
 Pro-Wrestling: EVE
 Pro-Wrestling: EVE Championship (3 times)
 Queen of the Ring (2012)
 Pro Wrestling Illustrated
 Ranked No. 18 of the top 100 female singles wrestlers in the PWI Women's 100 in 2019
 Ranked No. 22 of the top 50 tag teams in the PWI Tag Team 50 in 2020 – 
 World Wide Wrestling League
 W3L Women's Championship (1 time)
 WWE
 WWE Raw Women's Championship (1 time)
 WWE Women's Tag Team Championship (3 times) – with Alexa Bliss (2) and Rhea Ripley (1)
WWE 24/7 Championship (11 times, final)
 Women's Money in the Bank (2021)

References

External links 

 
 
 
 

1989 births
21st-century professional wrestlers
Alumni of the University of Glasgow
Expatriate professional wrestlers
Living people
Professional wrestling managers and valets
Scottish female professional wrestlers
Sportspeople from Glasgow
People educated at St Mungo's Academy
WWE 24/7 Champions
WWE Raw Women's Champions
WWE Women's Tag Team Champions